Urtinotherium (meaning "Urtyn beast") is an extinct genus of paracerathere mammals. It was a large animal that was closely related to Paraceratherium, and found in rocks dating from the Late Eocene to Early Oligocene period. The remains were first discovered in the Urtyn Obo region (now Dorbod Banner, Ulanqab) in Inner Mongolia, which the name Urtinotherium is based upon. Other referred specimens are from northern China.

Description
Urtinotherium was a representative of the large family Paraceratheriidae, and almost reached the proportions of Paraceratherium. It is known from several findings in central and eastern Asia, though no complete skeletons are known. The holotype fossil (catalog number IVPP V.2769) includes a complete lower jaw  in length, comparable to the smallest known of Paraceratherium. The jaw is wedge shaped, very low in height, and with elongated branches. The symphysis was solid and extended to the beginning of the second premolars. The jaws dentition is complete, having three front incisors and canine. The other incisors and canines had much smaller crowns. Between each tooth is a small space, similar to its phylogenetically primitive relatives such as Juxia. Its back teeth, which are separated from the front teeth by a small diastema, consist of four premolars and three molars. These are similar in structure to those of Paraceratherium, with small premolars and larger molars. The latter have low crowns (are brachyodont) and had few enamel folds.

Distribution
The remains of Urtinotherium are found mainly in the eastern and central Asia, consisting mostly of jaw fragments and isolated teeth. The holotype jaw was found in the early 1960s in the Urtyn-Obo Formation of Inner Mongolia, which dates from the Late Eocene. Additional findings came from Yunnan province in China and Late Eocene deposits of Khoer-Dzam in Mongolia. Further findings have been made in Saissansee Aksyir Svita basin in eastern Kazakhstan, also of the same age. Urtinotherium likely survived into the Early Oligocene, as fossils probably from it have been found in the Mera Formation of Transylvania, Romania.

Classification
Urtinotherium pertains to the Paraceratheriidae subfamily Paraceratheriinae. These in turn are part of the superfamily Rhinocerotoidea and therefore represent close relatives of modern rhinoceroses. The paraceratheres are distinguished by the formation of large sharp incisors in their upper and lower jaws, while rhinoceroses only have a two on the lower jaw. Urtinotherium was thought of by Leonard Radinsky to be a transitional form between earlier paraceratheres, like Juxia, and later forms, such as Paraceratherium and Indricotherium (now Paraceratherium transouralicum).

This genus represents a primitive form of paracerathere that developed in the late Eocene. It is possibly descended from Juxia, which lived during the Middle Eocene in northern China, and which shares with it having a full set of teeth in its jaws. However, Urtinotherium differs by its larger body size and greater specialization in the incisors. Urtinotherium and later Paraceratherium form the most derived section of the largest known rhinocerotoid lineage. In their specialization emphasizes that compared to Urtinotherium, they possessed significantly reduced dentition with only a couple of incisors in the lower jaw.

The first description of Urtinotherium was published in 1963 by Zhou Ming-Zhen and Chiu Chan-Siang, based on the lower jaw. The type species is recognized as Urtinotherium incisivum. The genus name comes from the location, and from the Ancient Greek word  meaning "beast". The species name refers to its elongated incisivos.

References

Eocene rhinoceroses
Inner Mongolia
Oligocene rhinoceroses
Hyracodonts
Fossil taxa described in 1963